Westernbödefeld is a locality in the municipality Schmallenberg in the district Hochsauerlandkreis in North Rhine-Westphalia, Germany.

The village has 316 inhabitants and lies in the north of the municipality of Schmallenberg at a height of around 443 m. Westernbödefeld  borders on the villages of Brabecke, Bödefeld, Gellinghausen, Dornheim and Frielinghausen. In the village centre the river Palme flows in the Brabecke and the Landstraße 776  meets the Landstraße L 740.  

Westernbödefeld was first mentioned in  1314 in a document. The village used to belong to the municipality of Bödefeld Land in Amt Fredeburg until the end of 1974.

Gallery

References

Villages in North Rhine-Westphalia
Schmallenberg